Kemankeş Kara Mustafa Pasha ("Black Mustafa Pasha, the Archer, the Courageous" in Turkish; 1592 – 31 January 1644) was an Ottoman Albanian military officer and statesman. He served as Kapudan Pasha and as grand vizier.

Early life 
Mustafa was an Albanian, born in Avlonya (modern Vlorë in Albania) in 1592. He was an officer in the Janissary corps. His epithet Kemankeş refers to his talent as an archer. He was the deputy of the Janissary commander in 1634 and was promoted to the post of Agha of the Janissaries in 1635. On 17 October 1635, he was appointed Kapudan Pasha (Grand Admiral of the Navy). Nevertheless, he participated in the Capture of Baghdad far from the sea. On 24 December 1638, after the death of the former grand vizier Tayyar Mehmet Pasha during the siege, Sultan Murad IV appointed Kemankeş Mustafa as the new grand vizier, the highest post of the empire after the sultan.

As a grand vizier 
After Baghdad was conquered, and Kemankeş Mustafa represented the Ottoman side in the consequent peace talks. By the Treaty of Zuhab signed on 17 May 1639, the rough outline for the frontier between modern-day Iran and the states of Turkey and Iraq was laid. Murad IV died on 9 February 1640 and Kemankeş Mustafa continued as a grand vizier during Ibrahim's reign. Ibrahim was a weak sultan, and Kemankeş Mustafa became the de facto ruler of the empire. Using severe methods, he ended the rebellions, balanced the budget, and reduced the number of soldiers. He also used his power to subdue (and even kill) other able statesmen whom he thought to be potential competitors for his post.

Death 
Kemankeş Mustafa made many enemies. His most important opposition was a kind of triumvirate in the palace, formed by Kösem Sultan (the sultan's mother), Turhan Sultan (the sultan's haseki), a charlatan named Djindji Khodja, and a vizier named Sultanzade Mehmed Pasha. They began to criticize Kemankeş Mustafa vehemently. Although he gave his resignation several times, it was not accepted by the sultan. However, the sultan, who was initially pleased with Kemankeş Mustafa, finally dismissed him on 31 January 1644. A few hours later, he was executed.

Legacy 
In 1642, Mustafa Pasha converted a Roman Catholic church in Istanbul into a mosque named Odalar Mosque. According to Professor Semavi Eyice, the original church, a Byzantine one, was probably the Monastery of Philanthropos but was converted to the Latin cult and renamed Santa Maria di Constantinopoli during the reign of Mehmed II.

Popular Culture 

 In the 2015 TV series Muhteşem Yüzyıl: Kösem, Kemankeş Kara Mustafa Pasha is portrayed by Turkish actor İsmail Demirci.

References

Pashas
17th-century Grand Viziers of the Ottoman Empire
Albanian Grand Viziers of the Ottoman Empire
1644 deaths
1592 births
Executed people from the Ottoman Empire
Devshirme
Albanians from the Ottoman Empire
Ottoman people of the Ottoman–Persian Wars
17th-century Albanian people
People from Vlorë
17th-century executions by the Ottoman Empire
Executed Albanian people
Kapudan Pashas
Albanian Pashas